Roy Southernwood (born 23 June 1968) is a former professional rugby league footballer who played in the 1980s, 1990s and 2000s.

Playing career

International honours
Roy Southernwood was the captain for the Great Britain Under-21s twice against France in 1989, winning the man of the match award on the return leg at Headingley, Leeds.

County Cup Final appearances
Roy Southernwood played  in Castleford's 12-12 draw with Bradford Northern in the 1987 Yorkshire County Cup Final during the 1987–88 season at Headingley, Leeds on Saturday 17 October 1987, played  in the 2-11 defeat by Bradford Northern in the 1987 Yorkshire County Cup Final replay during the 1987–88 season at Elland Road, Leeds on Saturday 31 October 1987, and played  in the 11-8 victory over Wakefield Trinity in the 1990 Yorkshire County Cup Final during the 1990–91 season at Elland Road, Leeds on Sunday 23 September 1990.

First Division Grand Final appearances
Roy Southernwood played  and scored a try in Wakefield Trinity's 24-22 victory over Featherstone Rovers in the 1998 First Division Grand Final at the McAlpine Stadium, Huddersfield on Saturday 26 September 1998.

Contemporaneous article extract
"Roy Southernwood Scrum-half. Skilful Scrum half who graduated through the junior league ranks in Castleford, and seemed set for a long career at Wheldon Road. Played for Great Britain U-21s twice against France in 1989. His transfer to Halifax meant more first team opportunities and he starred in the 1990-91 promotion season."

Genealogical information
Roy Southernwood is the older brother of David John Southernwood (birth registered during fourth ¼  in Hemsworth district), the rugby league footballer, Graham Southernwood, and Kevin Roger Southernwood (birth registered during fourth ¼  in Wakefield district), and is the uncle of Graham Southernwood's son, the rugby league footballer, Cain Southernwood.

References

External links

Halifax Put Richard Smith On Transfer List

1968 births
Living people
Castleford Tigers players
English rugby league players
Great Britain under-21 national rugby league team players
Halifax R.L.F.C. players
Place of birth missing (living people)
Rugby league halfbacks
Rugby league hookers
Southernwood family
Wakefield Trinity captains
Wakefield Trinity players